An initial sound table is a table, list or chart which shows the initial sound letter of a word together with its picture (pictured words). The initial sound table can assist students to recognise initial sounds and to get first reading and writing skills. In 1658 John Amos Comenius created an initial sound table in Orbis Pictus (a picture book intended for children).

Alternative names: initial sound list, initial sound chart, initial sound alphabet, alphabet chart, alphabet picture chart

Writing to read 
In the German-speaking countries, language experience is often based on children's writing of stories that involves invented spellings (e.g. with the help of an "initial sound table" picturing words that start with a specific sound). The Swiss teacher Jürgen Reichen (progressive education) founded this "writing to read" method 1982. The method combines two basic features of in favour of "phonics" (unduly equated with "direct instruction", stepwise teaching, etc.). According to this approach children should be encouraged to "write
words as they pronounce them" with the help of an "initial sound list" of pictured words.
Constructing words in this way is supposed to help them to understand the basic relationship
between spoken and written language.

Johann Amos Comenius already added 1658 an initial-sound-table to his „Orbis sensualium pictus“.

Initial sound keyboard 
There are software for children which has a multimedial initial sound keyboard for text input (virtual keyboard). Several hardware keyboards for kids also have initial sound pictures on its keys. With initial sound stickers and a standard computer keyboard you can create your own initial sound keyboard.app0l

Initial sound examples 
There are initial sounds, medial sounds and final sounds.

See also 
 Language education
 Phonics, Phonetics
 Phonemic awareness
 Initial Teaching Alphabet
 Literacy
 Gio-Key-Board (free word processor with initial sound keyboard)

Bibliography 
 Fabian Bross (2016): Initial Sound Tables—Blessing or Curse for Learning to Read and Write? In: Kritische Ausgabe. Zeitschrift für Germanistik & Literatur, 30, pp. 108–117.
 Günther Thomé, Dorothea Thomé (2016):  Deutsche Wörter nach Laut- und Schrifteinheiten gegliedert, Oldenburg: isb-Verlag.

External links 
 Alphabet action - (Learning Planet)
 Initial sound table from Comenius (Orbis Pictus, 1658) - (UNED)

Phonics
Writing
Reading (process)